Nesseaue is a Verwaltungsgemeinschaft ("collective municipality") in the district of Gotha, in Thuringia, Germany. The seat of the Verwaltungsgemeinschaft is in Friemar.

The Verwaltungsgemeinschaft Nesseaue consists of the following municipalities:

Bienstädt 
Eschenbergen 
Friemar
Molschleben 
Nottleben 
Pferdingsleben 
Tröchtelborn 
Tüttleben 
Zimmernsupra

References

Verwaltungsgemeinschaften in Thuringia